is a manga by . There are a total of five volumes in this series. The first was published in English by Tokyopop on October 10, 2006. The second volume of this series was released by Tokyopop on February 13, 2007. Judas is cursed for his sins to kill six hundred and sixty six (666) people to regain his humanity. However, he is forbidden human contact and has no corporeal body. In order to kill, he uses his slave, Eve, to kill for him. Every time Eve's blood is spilled, Judas comes out and forces Eve to "say his prayers", in other words, kill. However, despite being forced to commit such heinous acts, Eve is also forced to dress like a girl. Judas had mistaken him for girl when they had first met, and he has forced Eve to dress like a girl. Sometime along the course of their strange relationship, they meet a professor, who joins them.

Plot
Mizuki is conversing with Sorahito about where people go when they die with him responding "no they go to Eden". Eden becomes a referring place during the course of the Manga and finally introduces Eve the character whom Judas is attached to. Judas is The spirit of Death and apostle who betrayed Jesus. His curse is to kill 666 people so he may gain his humanity it is implied that they have been together for some time and have taken many lives. When Sorahito becomes obsessed with finding "Eden" he tries making Mizuki join him so they can go to "Eden" together. Eve who is really a boy and confused to be a girl all the time including Judas which is explained that when they first met Judas confused Eve for a girl so now he makes him wear girls' clothes, confronts Sorahito and tries changing his mind but Sorahito tries killing Eve. In response Judas is summoned and combine their powers and kill Sorahito. Later Mizuiki meets Dr. Hibuki who is a doctor and becomes desperate for Eden too. Hibuki is visited secretly by a bald man who gives him power. When Hibuki is killed a strange necklace is found where Judas says "Damn Peter! What the hell is he creating me? The hell!!". Later Mizuki meanwhile has been researching on what Eden actually is and the "Holy Council" when she asks Judas about it Judas only says "Do not interfere". Eve then tells Mizuki of a man whom Judas was attached to and who may hold the answers to everything. This man is in New York. The FBI arrive to arrest him but the man kills all of the agents including destroying the helicopters. The man, revealed to be Zero Maschaitto then talks about "opening the doors to Paradise".

Zero meets with the bald man, Peter. Peter commands Zero to do battle with Judas and to take back what he took from Zero. Zero departs with Peter saying "what terror there will be". Mizuki, Eve and Judas and Kugiku Mizuki's friend get a visitor who is a friend of Mizukis. She is revealed to be Sorahito's sister and Mizuki decides to tell her want happened to him however they are drawn by a mysterious force. Judas is the only one not affected and it turns out Zero is the cause for their kidnapping. Zero says that he will take everything from him and take back what was taken from him by Judas. Zero reveals that Peter plans to resurrect the twelve apostles and together open the gates of Eden. The one who betrayed Christ is revealed to be Judas himself - the historical figure. Zero aims to kill Eve who without, Judas will turn to nothing but suddenly he is freed and Judas and Eve combine their powers and take on Zero. They have a fierce battle and it is revealed that Peter who is the apostle Peter plans to clone Judas but this is foiled. In the end Zero departs and Peter summons the first of the revelations of John, Rain and hail mingled with blood which falls onto the earth. At a cafe it is revealed that Saints John and Philip have been revived and soon after the waitresses speak to them they are killed by John And Philip uses his time powers to switch the clocks back making it possible for the second seal to be opened "A great mountain of Fire Erupting" Mt.Fuji is blown up and thousands upon thousands are killed as a result. As the Apostles are resurrecting and Peter laughs in delight, Judas and Eve have had enough and declare that they're going to "pity the fuck out of them" thus concluding volume 2.

Mizuki is tricked into going to a house from an email which said it was from Sorahito who says that he is alive and wishes to speak with her. In reality however St. Thomas tricked her and wishes to "try" her for her sins. Eve and Judas run to the house and find that Thomas has begun the trial. Thomas reveals to them that Mizuki when shes was a girl had "untolerable feelings" for sorahito when though taking vows of chastity, Mizuki would in the night go to his room and kiss him and finally betrayed him to Judas (who killed him in volume 1). It is also shown when Thomas tried to judge Eve that Eve has killed a great number of people, Judas then called Eve the "Other Angel of Death".

External links
Tokyopop's Judas page
 Review by Comic Book Bin
 Review by Sequential Tart
 Review by Mania.com
 Viz Media's Judas page

2004 manga
Kadokawa Shoten manga
Mythology in comics
Shōnen manga
Tokyopop titles
Viz Media manga